The Hidden Valley is a 1916 American silent adventure fantasy film produced by Thanhouser and distributed by Pathé and directed by Ernest Warde. The film stars Valda Valkyrien, an actress from Denmark who beat 60,000 other contestants for the role. The film takes place in exotic Africa but was filmed at Coquina Beach, Florida.

While this is an original story, it apparently is influenced by H. Rider Haggard's classic 1887 novel She.

Cast
Valda Valkyrien as The White Goddess
Boyd Marshall as The Missionary
Ernest C. Warde as The High Priest
Arthur Bauer as The Ostrich Feather Importer
Pauline Taylor
Maud Traveller
Jack Doolittle

References

External links

allrovi/synopsis
Lobby poster

1916 films
Lost American films
Thanhouser Company films
American adventure drama films
American black-and-white films
American silent feature films
1910s adventure drama films
1910s fantasy adventure films
American fantasy adventure films
Pathé Exchange films
1916 lost films
1916 drama films
Films directed by Ernest C. Warde
1910s American films
Silent American drama films
Silent adventure films